The 2022 Bahraini Super Cup is the 16th season of the Bahraini Super Cup, an annual Bahraini football match played between the winners of the previous season's Bahraini Premier League and Bahraini King's Cup. The match was contested by 2021–22 League champions Al-Riffa, and the 2021–22 Domestic Cup champions Al-Khaldiya.

Match

Details

References

Bahraini Super Cup seasons
Super Cup
Bahrain